Al-Alam is an arabophone Moroccan newspaper of the nationalist Istiqlal party.

Al-Alam may also refer to:
 Al-Alam (magazine), an Egyptian magazine
 Al-Alam (Syria), a Syrian Daily newspaper founded in 1944
 Al-Alam News Network, an Iranian TV channel
 Al Alam Palace,  the ceremonial palace of Sultan Qaboos of Oman located in Old Muscat, Oman
 Al `Alam a village in south-western Yemen

See also